The 1902 DePauw football team was an American football team that represented DePauw University in the 1902 college football season.

Schedule

References

DePauw
DePauw Tigers football seasons
DePauw football